The One Minute Manager is a short book by Ken Blanchard and Spencer Johnson. The brief volume tells a story, recounting three techniques of an effective manager: one minute goals, one minute praisings, and one minute reprimands. Each of these takes only a minute but is purportedly of lasting benefit. Shortly after publication the book became a New York Times bestseller. The One Minute Manager has sold 15 million copies and been translated into 47 languages.

Content
If you were the manager of a company and given a minute, what would you do? In the story The One Minute Manager, describe a motivated young man is trying to find an effective manager. But after several searches, the results were always empty and disappointing. One day, he heard about a manager known as The One Minute Manager, and he visited the "one-minute manager" with suspicion, and finally realized that the true meaning of management comes from three secret:

Sequels
The book was followed by a sequel, Leadership and the One Minute Manager: Increasing Effectiveness Through Situational Leadership Ⅱ, by Ken Blanchard, Patricia Zigarmi and Drea Zigarmi, which laid out Blanchard's SLII® concept.

New Edition
An updated edition of the book, The New One Minute Manager, was published in 2015. In the new edition, the third technique, the one minute reprimand, was changed to the one minute redirect.

Repercussions

Criticism and controversies
The concept has been called a management fad, and derivative of management by objectives, itself derived from the business planning literature.
One critic called it "the executive equivalent of paper-training your dog."In 2001 the Wall Street Journal ran an article noting that The One Minute Manager bore a resemblance to an article written by Blanchard's former colleague, Arthur Elliot Carlisle. Carlisle's allegations of plagiarism were never proven.

Praise
The One Minute Manager has been widely praised for its universal appeal and for reducing esoteric management theory into simple, actionable techniques. Time magazine cited it as one of the 25 Most Influential Business Management Books.

References

External links
kenblanchard.com - homepage of The Ken Blanchard Companies
Blanchard's Situational Leadership II Model
The-One-Minute-Manager.pdf

Business books
1982 non-fiction books
Business fables
William Morrow and Company books
Collaborative non-fiction books